Mount Ptolemy may refer to:
 Mount Ptolemy (Antarctica)
 Mount Ptolemy (Canada)